Rokautskyia is a genus of flowering plant in the family Bromeliaceae, native to eastern Brazil. The genus was first established in 2017, and is placed in subfamily Bromelioideae.

Species
, Plants of the World Online accepted the following species, all transferred from Cryptanthus.
Rokautskyia aracruzensis (Leme & L.Kollmann) Leme, S.Heller & Zizka, syn. Cryptanthus aracruzensis Leme & L.Kollmann
Rokautskyia caulescens (I.Ramírez) Leme, S.Heller & Zizka, syn. Cryptanthus caulescens I.Ramírez
Rokautskyia exaltata (H.Luther) Leme, S.Heller & Zizka, syn. Cryptanthus exaltatus H.Luther
Rokautskyia fernseeoides (Leme) Leme, S.Heller & Zizka, syn. Cryptanthus fernseeoides Leme
Rokautskyia latifolia (Leme) Leme, S.Heller & Zizka, syn. Cryptanthus latifolius Leme
Rokautskyia leuzingerae (Leme) Leme, S.Heller & Zizka, syn. Cryptanthus leuzingerae Leme
Rokautskyia microglazioui (I.Ramírez) Leme, S.Heller & Zizka, syn. Cryptanthus microglazioui I.Ramírez
Rokautskyia odoratissima (Leme) Leme, S.Heller & Zizka, syn. Cryptanthus odoratissimus Leme
Rokautskyia pseudoglaziovii (Leme) Leme, S.Heller & Zizka, syn. Cryptanthus pseudoglaziovii Leme
Rokautskyia pseudoscaposa (L.B.Sm.) Leme, S.Heller & Zizka, syn. Cryptanthus pseudoscaposus L.B.Sm.
Rokautskyia roberto-kautskyi (Leme) Leme, S.Heller & Zizka, syn. Cryptanthus roberto-kautskyi Leme
Rokautskyia sanctaluciae (Leme & L.Kollmann) Leme, S.Heller & Zizka, syn. Cryptanthus sanctaluciae Leme & L.Kollmann
Rokautskyia scaposa (E.Pereira) Leme, S.Heller & Zizka, syn. Cryptanthus scaposus E.Pereira
Rokautskyia whitmanii (Leme) Leme, S.Heller & Zizka, syn. Cryptanthus whitmanii Leme

References

 
Bromeliaceae genera